Filip Totyu Nunatak (‘Nunatak Filip Totyu’ \'nu-na-tak 'fi-lip 'to-tyu\) is the rocky ridge extending 3.9 km in north-south direction, 960 m wide, with twin heights rising to 656 m (northern one) and 627 m (southern one) on Oscar II Coast in Graham Land.  It overlooks Adie Inlet to the southeast.  The feature is named after Filip Totyu (Todor Stanchev, 1830-1907), a leader of the Bulgarian liberation movement, in connection with the settlement Filip Totevo in Northern Bulgaria.

Location
British mapping in 1974.

Maps
 British Antarctic Territory: Graham Land.  Scale 1:250000 topographic map.  BAS 250 Series, Sheet SQ 19-20.  London, 1974.
 Antarctic Digital Database (ADD). Scale 1:250000 topographic map of Antarctica. Scientific Committee on Antarctic Research (SCAR). Since 1993, regularly upgraded and updated.

Notes

References
 Filip Totyu Nunatak. SCAR Composite Antarctic Gazetteer.
 Bulgarian Antarctic Gazetteer. Antarctic Place-names Commission. (details in Bulgarian, basic data in English)

External links
 Filip Totyu Nunatak. Copernix satellite image

Nunataks of Graham Land
Oscar II Coast
Bulgaria and the Antarctic